Marie Seymour Lucas, née Marie Elizabeth Cornelissen (1855–1921), was a French-born English painter. She studied in London, where she married painter John Seymour Lucas. She lived in England for the rest of her life.

Daughter of Louis Dieudonné Cornelissen and Marianne, née Bath, she was born in France. Her parents sent her to England for some of her education, and she attended St. Martin's Lane Academy and later the Royal Academy. There she began showing her work in 1877. As she married the painter John Seymour Lucas the same year, Marie Cornelissen became known professionally only by her married name. She is known for historical works and genre scenes, but she later concentrated on domestic scenes with children.

Lucas exhibited her work at the Palace of Fine Arts at the 1893 World's Columbian Exposition in Chicago, Illinois. Her painting of orphans We are but little children weak, nor born to any high estate was included in the 1905 book Women Painters of the World.

She died in Hendon, Middlesex.

References

External links

Marie Seymour Lucas, Artnet
 
 Sydney Seymour Lucas (son) at WorldCat

1855 births
1921 deaths
British women painters
19th-century English painters
20th-century English painters
19th-century British women artists
20th-century British women artists